Majesty Rochelle York (born February 29, 1992), better known as Majesty Rose, is a female singer from Goldsboro, North Carolina. She finished in ninth place on the thirteenth season of American Idol and released the EP, Bloom, in 2016.

Early life
Majesty Rose was born on February 29, 1992, to Lori Grant and Rickey York. Rose began writing at age ten and taught herself the acoustic guitar at seventeen. Despite her skills as a singer and guitarist, she has never taken formal lessons.

She was a student at the Eastern Wayne High School and graduated in 2010. She also attended Wayne Community College and participated in SGA (Student Government Association). She worked as a preschool teacher at the Goldsboro Family YMCA before appearing on American Idol. Rose is known in her community for serving at multiple churches and volunteering at nursing homes and community outreach projects.

According to Rose, she changed her name from Majesty Rochelle York to Majesty Rose as a dare going into American Idol. She always wished her name was "Rose".

American Idol

Rose took part in a competition at The American Idol Experience in Disney's Hollywood Studios while she was on a holiday with her best friend's family in Florida.  Rose sang the song "Reflection" from film Mulan and won a ticket to audition in front of the producers on American Idol.

In the results show for the top 11-week, Rose was in the bottom 3, but ultimately Ben Briley was eliminated. In the following week she was again in the bottom 3, but ultimately MK Nobilette was eliminated. Rose herself, was eliminated in the top 9.

Post-Idol
Rose released an EP, titled Bloom, in June 2016. The EP received a positive review from Mark Franklin of The York Dispatchs blog, Idol Chatter.

References

External links
  Facebook
 Twitter

21st-century American singers
American Idol participants
Living people
21st-century African-American women singers
Singers from North Carolina
People from Goldsboro, North Carolina
1992 births
21st-century American women singers